Rising Star is the second mini-album by South Korean singer Taegoon. It was released on May 13, 2009. Taegoon received intensive vocal training from Wheesung during the preparations of this album and worked closely with him during the production. Wheesung also wrote and composed the songs "슈퍼스타" and "네까짓 게"

Singles
"Superstar" was the first single to be released from the EP.  The debut performance was on MBC's show Music Core on May 16, 2009. The video for the song featured Park Shin-hye.

Track listing
 Intro (feat. 혁성 from Space Cowboy, 김여희) [(feat. Hyoksung from Space Cowboy, Yeo Hee Kim)]
 슈퍼스타 (feat. 낯선) ("Superstar (feat. Nassun)")
 Bye Bye
 네까짓 게 ("As Insignificant As You") [Nekkajit Ge]
 Call Me (Remix) (Feat. H-유진) [feat. H-Yujin]

2009 EPs
Taegoon EPs